The Law & the Heart: Stories to Bend the Mind & Soul is a collection of science fiction short stories by American writer Kenneth Schneyer. It was first published by Stillpoint/Prometheus in paperback and ebook in May 2014.

Summary
The book collects thirteen short works of fiction by the author,  together with a foreword by Liz Argall.

Contents
"Foreword" (Liz Argall)
I - The Law
"Conflagration" (from Newport Review, Summer 2010)
"I Have Read the Terms of Use" (from Daily Science Fiction, December 3, 2013)
"Grapple with Thee" (with Gareth D. Jones) (first publication)
"Half a Degree" (first publication)
"The Whole Truth Witness" (from Analog Science Fiction & Fact, October 2010)
"Exceptionalism" (first publication)
"Life of the Author Plus Seventy" (from Analog Science Fiction & Fact, September 2013)
II - The Heart
"Liza's Home" (from GUD: Greatest Uncommon Denominator, Winter 2009)
"The Orpheus Fountain" (first publication)
"Keeping Tabs" (from Abyss & Apex, 4th quarter, 2011)
"Hear the Enemy, My Daughter" (from Strange Horizons, May 6, 2013)
III - The Law & the Heart
"The Tortoise Parliament" (from First Contact: Digital Science Fiction Anthology I, June 2011)
"Tenure Track" (from Cosmos Online, November 23, 2010)
"About the Author"

References

2014 short story collections
Science fiction short story collections
Prometheus Books books